Forbidden Women refers to the following films:

 Forbidden Women (1948 film), Philippine film
 Forbidden Women (1959 film), Egyptian film

See also
 The Forbidden Woman (disambiguation)